A Co-respondent's Course is a short 1931 Australian film. The screenplay was written by Montague Grover (1870–1943), an experienced journalist. The film was the first film made by Efftee Studios, a production company owned by F.W. Thring, the first Australian narrative film to be completed with an optical soundtrack and part of the first all-Australian full-length unit programme to be screened in Australia.

Plot
The film is a matrimonial comedy, that featured the dramatic reunion of lovers on London Bridge.

Solicitor James Lord is in love with Nellie. She tells him she is going away for a week with her friend May to Portsea where there are many nice boys. Nellie gets the dates wrong and goes a day early. When James finds out he worries she is cheating on him. His client Rouse comes in and says he is convinced his wife is cheating on him a man called Dane. They hire three private eyes from Sleath's Detective Agency, Hall, Ratchet and Moon, to keep an eye on women.

The bungling of these private investigators provides the film's slight humor. In the end, both men realize their wives are faithful and all's well that ends well.

Cast
Donalda Warne as Nellie O'Neill
John D'Arcy as James Lord
Patricia Minchin as May
Ed Warrington as Hall
Oliver Peacock as Ratchet
George Moon as Moloney

Production
The film was directed by a young European, E.A. Dietrich-Derrick and was written by Monty Grover, editor of Melbourne tabloid The Sun. It was the first film produced by Efftee and was shot between April and June 1931.

Release
Diggers (1931) was originally meant to be released on a double bill with The Haunted Barn. However that movie encountered censorship problems and A Co-respondent's Course, although shot later, was selected to support Diggers instead. It encountered trouble from the Victorian censor.

Peter Fitzpatrick, biographer of F.W. Thring, later wrote that the film was "heavy-going":
The lack of action in many of its dialogue scenes is exacerbated by the static single-take camera work, and by an excessive concern with circumstantial realism that produces 'book-ends' of extended hellos and goodbyes in many scenes, and excruciatingly prolonged telephone calls in which phone numbers are always carefully enunciated and there are long pauses while the caller listens patiently to someone whom we cannot see or hear. And a lot of the conversation is stagey and stilted. Still... the film... [has] at least a period charm.
Fitzpatrick though the movie was partly redeemed by making fun of the absurdity of its male characters and use of external locations.

See also
Cinema of Australia

References

Fitzpatrick, Peter, The Two Frank Thrings, Monash University, 2012

External links
A Co-respondent's Course at National Film and Sound Archive

Australian comedy short films
1931 films
1931 short films